Lion Heart is the fifth Korean studio album and the eighth overall by South Korean girl group Girls' Generation. Produced by Lee Soo-man, Lion Heart musically encompasses styles of electropop and bubblegum pop. It was released in two parts throughout August 18 and August 19, 2015, by S.M. Entertainment; another version with a different cover titled You Think was distributed on August 26, 2015. This is the group's first Korean studio album without former member Jessica who was removed from the group on September 30, 2014.

The album spawned three singles. Its lead single, "Party", was released on July 7, 2015, and peaked atop the Gaon Digital Chart, further reaching number ten on the Japan Hot 100. It was followed up by "Lion Heart" and "You Think" in August 2015, charting at number four and thirty on the Gaon Digital Chart, respectively. In order to promote the record, Girls' Generation appeared on several South Korean music programs, such as Music Bank, Show! Music Core, and Inkigayo, where they performed material from the album. The group additionally embarked on a concert tour named Girls' Generation's Phantasia, which commenced on November 21, 2015, in Seoul and visited East and Southeast Asia.

Background and composition 
According to Slant Magazine's Anzhe Zhang, Lion Heart consists of primarily bubblegum pop songs. Echoing Zhang's viewpoint, Chester Chin from Malaysian newspaper The Star wrote that the album was a collection of bubblegum pop tracks. The record's opening track, "Lion Heart", is a soul pop-influenced bubblegum pop song which embraces a retro-styled sound while being instrumented by basslines and brass. "Party" was detailed as an electropop song that is backed up by guitars, synthesizers and Auto-Tune. Aside from the signature sound, Lion Heart also encompasses several other genres; "You Think" was characterized as an electropop and hip hop recording featuring trap beats and horns in its composition. "One Afternoon" draws influence from bossa nova and incorporates Spanish guitars, while "Show Girls" portrays an electropop song originally recorded in Japanese for the group's 2014 greatest hits album, The Best. "Check" is a mild R&B track, and "Sign" was described as a dark synthpop song. "Bump It" is a hybrid of various genres that incorporates hi-hat beats.

Release and promotion 

On June 30, 2015, the group released music video previews of three then-forthcoming singles "Party", "Lion Heart" and "You Think", serving as a promotional tool for their first Korean language studio album as an eight-member group. Details on album, including its title, release date, cover artwork and track list, were announced on August 12, 2015. The group's label, S.M. Entertainment, revealed that the record would be released in the span of two days. The first six songs—including the single "Lion Heart"—would be made available on August 18, while the remaining tracks—including the single "You Think"—would be distributed on the following day; Billboard described the release strategy as "atypical." An alternative edition of the album featuring a different artwork was additionally released on August 26, 2015, under the title You Think.

Following the release of the record, Girls' Generation appeared on several South Korean music programs, including KBS's Music Bank, MBC's Show! Music Core, and SBS' Inkigayo, in order to promote the record, with them performing "Lion Heart" and "You Think". Throughout August 18–25, the group also participated and interacted with viewers through a series of mobile video live stream on Naver's mobile application "V". Subsequently, the group additionally embarked on a concert tour titled Girls' Generation's Phantasia, which kicked off on November 21, 2015, at the Olympic Gymnastics Arena in Seoul, and continued in visiting Japan, Thailand, Indonesia and Taiwan.

"Party" was made available as the lead single from Lion Heart for digital purchase by S.M. Entertainment on July 7, 2015. The physical CD single was made available for purchase on July 8, 2015. An accompanying music video for the recording was released in conjunction with the release of the single. Commercially, "Party" debuted atop the Gaon Digital Chart on the chart issue dated July 11, 2015, selling 256,390 digital units within its first week of availability, bringing total sales to over 843,843 digital units in South Korea as of December 2015, thus becoming the 58th best-selling single of 2015. "Party" additionally peaked at number ten on the Japan Hot 100 and number four on the Billboard World Digital Songs. The title track was serviced as the album's second single, and its music video premiered on August 18, 2015. Subsequently, "You Think" served as the third and final single, being accompanied by a visual which was released the day following "Lion Heart"'s availability. The title track was added to Korean Broadcasting System's "K-Pop Connection" radio playlist on August 21, while "You Think" impacted KBS radio on August 23. Both songs charted on the Gaon Digital Chart, peaking at numbers four and 30, respectively.

Critical reception 

Upon its release, Lion Heart garnered mixed reviews from music critics. Slant Magazines Anzhe Zhang wrote that the album was released to "quash" the suspicions that Girls' Generation was declining after the departure of member Jessica in September 2014. However, she added, "while [the album]'s great for omnivorous die-hard fans, it ultimately feels a little more than scatter-brained." Chester Chin, penning for Malaysian newspaper The Star, praised the release of singles "Party", "Lion Heart" and "You Think" as "a promising start." Nevertheless, he disapproved of the rest of the album, dubbing it a "relatively tame offering" for "[traversing] way too quickly into filler territory" and criticizing the songs "Green Light" and "Paradise" for being too "generic." Kim Do-heon from South Korean online magazine IZM was slightly more positive towards the album, calling it "elegant", and appreciating the record's musical styles even though he felt that it was a decline compared to the group's previous albums as a nine-piece group.

Lion Heart experienced commercial acclaim in South Korea. It debuted atop the Gaon Album Chart on the chart issue dated August 22, 2015, and remained on the top spot for a further week. Two weeks after its debut chart appearance, it dropped 35 positions, charting at number 36. Lion Heart was the best-selling album of August 2015 in South Korea, selling 131,228 physical copies, while overall being the 13th most-sold album of 2015 in that country with total sales of 145,044 units. Lion Heart additionally charted at number 11 on the Japanese Oricon Albums Chart on the chart issue dated August 31, 2015, while peaking atop the Billboard World Albums chart and becoming the group's second number one following their 2013 album, I Got a Boy.

Track listing 
Credits adapted from the liner notes of Lion Heart.

Personnel 

Credits adapted from the liner notes of Lion Heart.

S.M. Entertainment Co., Ltd.executive producer
Lee Soo-manproducer
Nam So-youngdirector of management
Jeong Chang-hwandirector of media planning
Lee Seong-sooA&R director and coordinator
Yoo Je-niA&R director and coordinator
Park Hae-inA&R director and coordinator
Jo Min-kyeonginternational A&R
Lee Seo-kyeonginternational A&R
Jeong Hyo-wonpublishing and copyright clearance
Kim Min-kyeongpublishing and copyright clearance
Oh Jeong-eunpublishing and copyright clearance
Park Mi-jipublishing and copyright clearance
Kim Cheol-soonrecording engineer
Jeong Ui-seokrecording engineer
Jeong Eun-kyeongrecording engineer
Kim Eun-cheolrecording engineer
Lee Ji-hongrecording engineer
Oh Seong-keunrecording engineer
Baek Kyeong-hoonrecording engineer assistant
Nam Koong-jin (SM Concert Hall Studio)mixing engineer
Koo Jong-pil (Beat Burger) (SM Yellow Tail Studio)mixing engineer
Kim Cheol-soon (SM Blue Ocean Studio)mixing engineer
Jeong Ui-seok (SM Blue Cup Studio)mixing engineer
Miles Walker (Silent Sound Studios, Atlanta)mixing engineer
Tom Coyne (Sterling Sound)master engineer
Tak Young-joonartist management and promotions
Choi Seong-wooartist management and promotions
Kim Ho-jinartist management and promotions
Kim Yong-deokartist management and promotions

Park Seong-joonartist management and promotions
Park Ki-mokartist management and promotions
Son Seung-wooartist management and promotions
Kim Yong-haartist management and promotions
Kang Mi-jooartist management and promotions
Lee Seong-sooartist planning and development
Yoon Hee-joonartist planning and development
Jo Yoo-eunartist planning and development
Kim Eun-apublic relations and publicity
Jeong Sang-heepublic relations and publicity
Lee Ji-seonpublic relations and publicity
Kwon Jeong-hwapublic relations and publicity
Lee Ji-hyeonpublic relations and publicity
Kim Min-seongmedia planner
Bok Min-kwonmedia planner
Jeong Kyeong-shikmedia planner
Tak Young-joonchoreography director
Hong Seong-yongchoreography director
Jae Sim (Beat Burger)choreography director
Greg Hwang (Beat Burger)choreography director
Tony Testachoreographer
Kyle Hanagamichoreographer
Jae Sim (Beat Burger)choreographer
Kevin Maherchoreographer
J.eunchoreographer
Jeong Jin-seok (Nana School)choreographer
Choi Jeong-mininternational marketing
Eom Hye-youngcustomer relationship management
Park Joon-youngmusic video direction

Son Youngmusic video direction
Jeon Seong-jinmusic video direction
Hong Won-kimusic video director
Ian Henrymusic video director
Lee Gi-baekmusic video director
Jo Woo-cheolart direction and design
Ji-younghair stylist
Woo-joohair stylist
Seo Soo-kyeongstylist
Seo Soo-myeongstylist
Lee Bo-rastylist
Park Soo-kyeongstylist
Ryu Ji-hyestylist
Kim Soo-binstylist
Seo Okmake-up artist
Jo Joo-youngmake-up artist
Han Jong-cheolphotographer
Lee Young-hakphotographer
Kim Yong-minexecutive supervisor
Girls' Generationvocals
Taeyeonvocals
Sunnyvocals
Tiffanyvocals
Hyoyeonvocals
Yurivocals
Sooyoungvocals
Yoonavocals
Seohyunvocals

Charts

Weekly charts

Monthly chart

Year-end chart

Release history

References

External links 
 

2015 albums
Girls' Generation albums
SM Entertainment albums
Korean-language albums